Tionesta is a borough in Forest County, Pennsylvania, United States. The population was 475 at the 2020 Census. It is the county seat of Forest County.  The name is a Native American word meaning "the home of the wolves." Visitors and residents are greeted to Tionesta with a sign reading "A special place with a relaxed pace"

Tionesta lies at the heart of a forested region that is a popular destination for hunters and other outdoor lovers.  While the general area has seen some growth as a result of this tourist activity, the borough proper has suffered several setbacks in recent years including the closure of an Evenflo plant that was a major employer and a 2002 fire that leveled an entire block of the borough's downtown area.

Geography

Climate

Demographics

As of the census of 2000, there were 615 people (296 males, 319 females), 282 households, and 166 families residing in the borough.  The population density was 457.5 people per square mile (177.2/km2). There were 337 housing units at an average density of 250.7 per square mile (97.1/km2). The racial makeup of the borough was 99.67% White, 0.16% Asian, and 0.16% from two or more races. Hispanic or Latino of any race were 0.49% of the population.

There were 282 households, out of which 22.0% had children under the age of 18 living with them, 49.6% were married couples living together, 7.1% had a female householder with no husband present, and 41.1% were non-families. 36.9% of all households were made up of individuals, and 24.1% had someone living alone who was 65 years of age or older. The average household size was 2.18 and the average family size was 2.88.

In the borough the population was spread out, with 21.8% under the age of 18, 6.0% from 18 to 24, 21.8% from 25 to 44, 29.4% from 45 to 64, and 21.0% who were 65 years of age or older. The median age was 45 years. For every 100 females there were 92.8 males. For every 100 females age 18 and over, there were 85.7 males.

The median income for a household in the borough was $26,806, and the median income for a family was $40,625. Males had a median income of $31,250 versus $23,889 for females. The per capita income for the borough was $17,799. About 9.2% of families and 14.1% of the population were below the poverty line, including 14.2% of those under age 18 and 12.7% of those age 65 or over.

Sherman Lighthouse

The Sherman Memorial Lighthouse, located on a 22.5-acre island in the Allegheny River, about 60 miles southeast of Erie. It opened in time to help the Forest County community of Tionesta celebrate its 150th birthday.  The 75-foot-tall lighthouse is on a 25-foot-high mound of soil on what used to be called Hunters Island, and has now been renamed Lighthouse Island.

It ultimately will share the island with the planned Pennsylvania Hunting and Fishing Museum.  Most lighthouses are more functional than decorative inside, but Sherman Lighthouse is different. It is finished and decorated as a showcase for the Sherman family memorabilia and to display a collection of more than 280 lighthouse replicas.

The octagon-shaped tower is made of timber instead of masonry or concrete. The 25-foot-tall aluminum and glass lantern room is equipped with the kind of beacon that a small regional airport would use. There are 76 steps in the spiral stairs that lead up the tower.

Notable people
Tionesta was the childhood home of Howard Zahniser, who became a conservationist and eventually the executive director of The Wilderness Society in Washington, D.C., and in that capacity wrote the Wilderness Act of 1964, which today permanently preserves from all forms of development more than 111 million acres of federal public lands all across America. Zahniser graduated from Tionesta High School in 1924, and in August 2001 a Pennsylvania Historical and Museum Commission roadside marker was installed along U.S. Route 62 just north of Tionesta along the Allegheny River near the Allegheny Islands Wilderness honoring Zahniser, his deep-rooted connection to Tionesta, and his life work for wilderness.

Tionesta was the hometown of Congressional Medal of Honor recipient O. O. Spence, killed during the Indian Campaign in 1876.

References and notes

County seats in Pennsylvania
Populated places established in 1838
Boroughs in Forest County, Pennsylvania
1838 establishments in Pennsylvania